Clube Desportivo Trofense, commonly known as Trofense, is a Portuguese football club based in Trofa, Portugal. Founded in 1930, it plays in Segunda Liga, holding home games at Estádio do Clube Desportivo Trofense, with a capacity of 5,074 spectators.

Club colours are red and blue (related to the badge).

History
In the 2005–06 season, Trofense played in the Portuguese Second Division, winning its group by six points. The club then progressed to a playoff that decided promotion to the second level, with Serie B winners A.D. Lousada; Trofense won in an emotional game, only decided on the 20th penalty, scored by goalkeeper Vítor.

In 2007–08 (having finished 11th in the league the previous season), Trofense achieved a first ever promotion to the top division, and conquered its second piece of silverware, winning by a small margin over Rio Ave FC (the first four teams were separated by just two points).

On 4 January 2009, Trofense managed an historical home win, beating S.L. Benfica 2–0, courtesy of Reguila and F.C. Porto loanee Hélder Barbosa, that then placed the side above the relegation zone. The following week, it achieved a 0–0 draw at the Estádio do Dragão against Porto, but the club would be eventually relegated.

Current squad

Out on loan

Honours
Segunda Liga
Champions (1): 2007–08
Campeonato de Portugal
Champions (1): 2020–21
Terceira Divisão
Champions (1): 1991–92

Managerial history

 José Domingos (1993–1994)
 Nicolau Vaqueiro (1994)
 Sá Pereira (1995–1996)
 Nicolau Vaqueiro (1996–1999)
 Jorge Regadas (1999–2000)
 Maki (2003–2005)
 Daniel Ramos (2005–2007)
 Toni (2007–2008)
 Tulipa (2008–2009)
 Vítor Oliveira (2009–2010)
 Daniel Ramos (2010)
 Porfírio Amorim (2010–2011)
 António Sousa (2011)
 João Eusébio (2011–2012)
 Professor Neca (2012)
 Micael Sequeira (2012–2013)
 Luís Diogo (2013)
 Porfírio Amorim (2014–2015)
 Vítor Oliveira (2015–2016)
 Bruno Pereira (2016–2017)
 Hélder Pereira (2018–2019)
 Rui Matos (2019)
 Rui Duarte (2020–2021)
 Francisco Chaló (2021–2022)
 Jorge Casquilha (2022–)

League and cup history

Last updated: 13 August 2022
Div. = Division; 1D = Portuguese League; 2H = Liga de Honra; CP = Campeonato de Portugal 2DS = Segunda Divisão; 3DS = Terceira Divisão
Pos. = Position; Pl = Match played; W = Win; D = Draw; L = Lost; GS = Goal scored; GA = Goal against; P = Points

References

External links
Official website 
Zerozero team profile

 
Trofense
Association football clubs established in 1930
1930 establishments in Portugal
Primeira Liga clubs
Liga Portugal 2 clubs